China International Fund (CIF) is a Chinese-owned group of Hong Kong investors that describes its major businesses as including "large-scale national reconstruction projects and infrastructure construction in developing countries". The CIF and its associated companies in Hong Kong and Singapore invested upwards of $US 20 billion mainly in unstable African dictatorships. They have made agreements with the Angolan and Guinean governments to explore for various resources in those countries. These agreements will result in billions of dollars of money being invested in the two countries. The Company is under the suspicion of being a state-owned company because "key personnel have ties to Chinese state-owned enterprises and government agencies."

Structure 
The United States-China Economic and Security Review Commission issued a report in July 2009 on investments of Dayuan, CIF and its subsidiaries in Africa, Latin America and the U.S.A.. China International Fund is owned to 99% by Dayuan International Development, which has about 30 subsidiaries. The report called these companies the "88 Queensway Group", after the Hong Kong address for headquarters of most subsidiaries. Files about the CIF does not give hard evidence of government ownership. On the other hand, Chairwoman Lo Fong Hung is director of Sonangol Sinopec International Ltd., a joint venture between the state-owned oil companies Sinopec of China and Sonangol of Angola. A CIF director, Wu Yang, was a vice chairman of Sinopec in a March 2006 U.N. report. It is believed that Sam Pa is President of the CIF.

Angola 
In a conversation between American Ambassador Dan Mozena and Chinese Ambassador Bolum Zhang, Zhang said, "the CIF made many promises to Angola, and that while the company has a large presence in Angola, its weak management and lack of leadership have stalled many of the projects. Zhang said that as the CIF is a 'private company,' the Chinese embassy does not actively participate or monitor its relationship with Angola. He added that CIF continues to benefit from the Hong Kong-based owner's 'close relationship' with President Dos Santos." It was involved in the construction of the Angola International Airport.

Guinea 
In October 2009, the military junta that ruled Guinea made a mining-and-infrastructure deal with China International Fund. CIF planned to invest at least $US 7 billion in a partnership to develop the country's mining of mineral resources, including diamonds, iron ore, oil and especially bauxite. In September 2011, Mohamed Lamine Fofana, the Mines Minister following the 2010 election, said that the government had overturned the agreement.

Literature 
 U.S.-China Economic & Security Review Commission, The 88 Queensway Group: A Case Study in Chinese Investors' Operations in Angola and Beyond, by Lee Levkowitz, Marta McLellan Ross, and J.R. Warner, July 10, 2009, PDF.
 Alex Vines/Lillian Wong/Markus Weimer/Indira Campos: Sede de Petróleo Africano Petrolíferas Nacionais Asiáticas na Nigéria e em Angola, Chatham House-report, January 2011.

References

External links 
 
 The Queensway syndicate and the Africa trade – The Economist, 13 August 2011

Investment companies of Hong Kong